Marcy Henry Randall (born 1842, date of death not found) was an American politician in the state of Washington. He served in the Washington House of Representatives from 1889 to 1891.

References

Republican Party members of the Washington House of Representatives
1842 births
Year of death unknown
Date of death unknown
People from Montgomery County, New York